Sandeep Singh Soraisam (born 1 March 1995) is an Indian professional footballer who plays as a right back for Indian Super League club Kerala Blasters.

Club career

Early career 
Sandeep did his youth football at the academy of Shillong Lajong before being promoted to the senior team in 2014. He made his debut for the senior team in a 5-2 loss against Pune FC on 30 January 2015 as which he came on as a substitute for Durga Boro in the 79th minute. Sandeep missed out to make any further appearance and was not played for the rest of the season and missed out to make any appearance in the next season as whole. He played his first match of the 2016-17 season against Aizawl on 17 January 2017 which ended 2-1 to Aizawl. He left Shillong for the I-League 2nd division club Langsning SC for the 2017-18 season before leaving the club for former Indian Super League side ATK for the 2018-19 season, where he didn't feature for the club on that season. Sandeep signed for the I-League club TRAU FC for the 2019-20 season. He played his debut match for the club on 11 December 2019 against Mohun Bagan in a 4-0 loss. Sandeep played his last match for the club against Indian Arrows on 12 January 2020 which they won 2-0.

Kerala Blasters
On 22 August 2020, Sandeep was signed by Indian Super League club Kerala Blasters on a one year contract. He made his debut for the Blasters on 13 December 2020 against Bengaluru FC, coming as a substitute in the 79th of the game in the centre back position which ended 4–2 for Bengaluru. In the match against FC Goa on 23 January 2021, Sandeep was used as a right back and he won the Hero of the Match Award. After that match, Sandeep was used as right back in most of the matches. On 20 February 2021, the Blasters extended his contract for one more year which made him to stay at the club till 2022.

Sandeep was named in the Blasters squad for the 2021 Durand Cup, and made 2 appearances for the club in the tournament. He played his first match of the 2021–22 Indian Super League season on 19 November 2021 in the season opener against ATK Mohun Bagan FC, which they lost 4–2. The season witnessed Sandeep's complete transformation from centre back to full back. When Harmanjot Khabra was injured, Sandeep started in most of the matches in the right back position. He was also used as a left back in few games.

On 4 June 2022, he extended his contract with the Blasters furthermore, which would keep him with at the club till 2025. Sandeep made his first start of the 2022–23 Indian Super League season on 5 October in a  3–0 win against NorthEast United FC where he provided an assist for Sahal Abdul Samad's goal in the injury time. On 26 December 2022, he scored his debut goal for the Blasters  against Odisha FC in the 86th minute of the match, where he headed in a long ball by Bryce Miranda as the Blasters won the match 1–0, and Sandeep won the hero of the match award for his performance. On 22 January, during the final minutes of the away game against Mumbai City FC, Sandeep picked up an injury after colliding with Saviour Gama in the air while attempting to head the ball. He landed in a poor position, twisting his ankle and was taken out in a stretcher after getting his head stitched. The club later confirmed that Sandeep has a fracture in his ankle and would undergo a surgery for the same.

Career statistics

Honours 
Kerala Blasters
 Indian Super League runner up: 2021–22

References

External links 
 

1995 births
Living people
Footballers from Manipur
Indian footballers
Shillong Lajong FC players
TRAU FC players
Association football defenders
I-League players
Indian Super League players
Kerala Blasters FC players
I-League 2nd Division players
ATK (football club) players